14 teams took part in the league with CSKA Moscow winning the championship.

League standings

Results

Top scorers
25 goals
 Sergei Solovyov (Dynamo Moscow)

23 goals
 Vsevolod Bobrov (CDKA Moscow)

19 goals
 Aleksandr Ponomarev (Torpedo Moscow)

16 goals
 Aleksandr Obotov (Lokomotiv Moscow)

15 goals
 Ivan Konov (Spartak Moscow)

14 goals
 Vladimir Dyomin (CDKA Moscow)

13 goals
 Grigory Fedotov (CDKA Moscow)

11 goals
 Konstantin Beskov (Dynamo Moscow)
 Boris Chuchelov (Spartak Moscow)
 Gaioz Jejelava (Dinamo Tbilisi)
 Aleksei Grinin (CDKA Moscow)
 Boris Tsybin (Dynamo Leningrad)

References

 Soviet Union - List of final tables (RSSSF)

1948
Soviet
Soviet
1